Chokusaisha is a shrine where an imperial envoy Chokushi performs rituals: chokushi sankō no jinja. 
The following table shows sixteen shrines designated as Chokusaisha.

Notes

External links 
 

Shinto shrines in Japan